Rangsdorf is a municipality in the district of Teltow-Fläming in Brandenburg in Germany. It has an airfield [up to 1940 a genuine commercial airport] from where on 20 July 1944 Claus Schenk Graf von Stauffenberg took off on his fateful attempt to assassinate German leader Adolf Hitler at his military headquarters in East Prussia, the Wolfsschanze.

Demography

References

Localities in Teltow-Fläming
Teltow (region)